Francis Xavier Pierz ( or Franc Pirec) (November 20, 1785 – January 22, 1880) was a Roman Catholic priest and missionary to the Ottawa and Ojibwe Indians in present-day Michigan, Wisconsin, Ontario, and Minnesota. Because his letters convinced numerous Catholic German Americans to settle in Central Minnesota, he is referred to as the "Father of the Diocese of Saint Cloud."

Early life
Father Pierz was born to a peasant family in Godič, near the Carniolan town of Kamnik in the Austrian Empire (now Slovenia) on November 20, 1785, and baptized Franz Xav. Pierz. He entered the seminary of Ljubljana in the fall of 1810 and was ordained on March 13, 1813, by Bishop Kovacic. Two of his brothers also became priests.

After seven years as assistant pastor of the mountain parishes of Kranjska Gora and Fusine in Valromana (Bela Peč, in Slovene), he was appointed parish priest of the villages of Peče and Podbrezje. After years of attempting to improve farming methods among the poor farmers of his parish, he published the book Kranjski Vertnar (The Carniolan Gardner) in 1830. His efforts led to his being awarded a medal of honor by the Carniolan Agricultural Society in 1842.

Missionary
In 1835, Pierz departed for the missions of the United States after years of being inspired by the published letters of the Slovenian missionary priest, and future Bishop, Father Frederic Baraga, who worked in present-day Upper Michigan and Wisconsin. Pierz arrived in the Diocese of Detroit on September 16, where he presented his credentials to Bishop Frederick Rese. As Lake Superior had already frozen, Father Pierz was prevented from immediately joining Father Baraga in Wisconsin and was assigned to the Ottawa of L'Arbre Croche, in what is now Little Traverse Bay Reservation in Michigan. Pierz brought with him from Slovenia his 12-year-old nephew Joseph Notsch Jr. The boy would accompany him on his trips, assist in serving Mass, and when necessary do the cooking. In 1855, Notsch's parents and siblings emigrated and joined him in St. Joseph, Minnesota.

In the summer of 1836, Bishop Rese transferred Pierz to the mission of Sault Ste. Marie, where Father Pierz fought to keep the struggling mission operating. He also sailed to other missions around the shores of Lake Superior, where he served Catholics among the Ottawa and Ojibwa, who spoke Algonquian languages.

On June 28, 1838, he reached Father Baraga at La Pointe, Wisconsin. After a friendly visit, Fr. Baraga persuaded Father Pierz to re-establish the mission at Grand Portage, Minnesota (now the Grand Portage Indian Reservation). The formerly great fur trading depot had declined with the removal of the North West Company's inland headquarters north to Fort William in 1803. The Ojibwa Indians living there had turned to commercial fishing on Lake Superior and selling their catches to the American Fur Company. Pierre Picotte, a Métis who worked as an agent for the company, had been instructing local Ojibwe in the Catechism and preparing them to join the Catholic Church. Father Pierz's letters describe how impressed he was by the zealous Ojibwa embrace of Catholicism. They also reveal that, unlike local Protestant missionaries, Pierz preached and taught in the Ojibwe language and trained the Grand Portage parish choir to sing hymns in Ojibwe as well.

Also at Grand Portage, Pierz arranged for the clearing of a plot of farmland and orchard which, in keeping with Ojibwe ways, was owned and worked in common. He arranged the sale of their surplus produce to nearby European-American miners. He founded a Catholic school for the children of the mission. His letters provide a vivid glimpse into daily life on the mission. The Catholic missions at Fort William, Ontario and Isle Royale were also under his jurisdiction. In October 1839, the bishop ordered Pierz to move to take over the missions at Harbor Springs, Michigan (now Little Traverse Bay Bands of Odawa Indians). He remained there for 12 years.

Minnesota
In Spring 1852, after a series of disputes with his bishop, Pierz secured a release from the Diocese of Detroit. He was recruited for the newly organized Diocese of Saint Paul, where Bishop Joseph Crétin urgently needed priests to serve his vast territory.

Father Pierz was assigned a mission field, comprising the whole of Minnesota Territory north of the Twin Cities. He established his headquarters in the village of Crow Wing. Traveling on foot between his missions, Pierz carried on his back all that was necessary for saying Mass. The Ojibwa dubbed him, "Old Man, Black Gown." Viewing him as a man of great spiritual power, they occasionally stole his socks to use as a folk remedy against rheumatism. As he had previously done at Grand Portage, Fr. Pierz continued to both preach and to teach his converts hymns in the Ojibwe language. During the 1920s, Ojibwe Catholics who had known him recalled during interviews on the White Earth Reservation that Fr. Pierz had a very beautiful voice when singing Catholic hymns in the Ojibwe language.

After the United States signed the Treaty of Traverse des Sioux with the Dakota people in 1851, it declared much of southern and central Minnesota open to settlement by White Anglo-Saxon Protestants and White ethnics. Noticing many Protestant Yankee settlers from the Northern Tier, Father Pierz began to promote the territory among German-American Catholics. Writing in newspapers such as Der Wahrheitsfreund (The Friend of Truth), based in Cincinnati, Ohio, he wrote glowing descriptions of Minnesota's climate, its soil, and its large tracts of free land for homesteaders.

In May 1855, the first wave of German, Luxembourger, and Slovene settlers began to arrive in large numbers, staking out claims throughout what are today Morrison, Benton, and Stearns counties. With his bishop unable to finance his work, Father Pierz began to rely on the Ludwig-Missionsverein and the Leopoldinen-Stiftung for desperately needed funds. Both European organizations had been formed to support Catholic missionaries abroad and were mainly funded by the Bavarian House of Wittelsbach and the Austro-Hungarian House of Habsburg.

Unable to care for both the settlers and the Ojibwa, Father Pierz pleaded with Bishop Crétin to send more priests to assist him. The Bishop wrote to Abbot Boniface Wimmer of Saint Vincent Archabbey in Latrobe, Pennsylvania. On May 21, 1856, a party of five Benedictine priests from Pennsylvania arrived on a steamboat at Sauk Rapids, Minnesota. They founded Saint John's Abbey. Unable to be there to greet them, Father Pierz had left a letter for the party's leader, Father Demetrius de Marogna, by which he formally transferred his missions in and around Sauk Rapids to the jurisdiction of the Benedictine Order.

The following year, he was instrumental in bringing a group of Benedictine nuns from the Abbey founded by Saint Walpurga in Eichstätt, Kingdom of Bavaria, to educate the children of the many German immigrants in Central Minnesota. They founded St. Benedict's Convent, College, and Monastery at St. Joseph.

In 1857, Fr. Pierz also invited fellow Slovenian missionary Fr. Lovrenc Lavtižar to Minnesota, where he was assigned to the Red Lake Indian Reservation. During the night of December 3, 1858, Fr. Lavtižar froze to death during a blizzard while returning across the ice of Red Lake after giving the Last Rites to a dying Ojibwe Catholic. Fr. Pierz subsequently eulogized his fellow missionary in a work of Slovenian poetry.

Peacemaker

During the Dakota War of 1862, Chief Hole in the Day of the Mississippi Band spoke out in favor of the Ojibwe joining forces with Chief Little Crow and the Dakota people to drive all American and European immigrants from Minnesota. His threats to attack and take control of Fort Ripley caused a great amount of terror at the fort. To further incite the Minnesota Ojibwe to join his uprising, he spread a false rumor that the Union Army was conscripting Ojibwe men to fight in the American Civil War. Largely in reaction to this rumor and warlike coaxing by Hole in the Day, a group from the Leech Lake Ojibwe burned down the Indian Agency in Walker, Minnesota, took prisoners, and marched to Crow Wing.

The other Ojibwe chiefs, however, did not agree with the idea of going to war against the United States Federal Government and, with many Ojibwe warriors, moved into Fort Ripley to help defend the fort against a possible attack from forces incited by Hole in the Day.

When all other peace-making efforts had failed, Fr. Pierz entered Hole in the Day's camp and convinced the Chief to journey with him to Crow Wing and sign a peace agreement with the United States Federal Government.

In 1863, Father Pierz sailed for Europe to recruit additional priests for the Minnesota missions. Among those who returned with him were Fathers Joseph Francis Buh (for whom Buh Township, in Morrison County, Minnesota is named), Ignaz Tomazin, and James Trobec (the future Bishop of Saint Cloud).

Following the death of his former mentor, Bishop Frederic Baraga, on January 19, 1868, Fr. Pierz eulogized him in a work of Slovenian poetry.

After the June 27, 1868 contract killing of Chief Hole in the Day by twelve hired gunmen from the Pillager Band, his son Ignatius Hole in the Day, a convert to Roman Catholicism, requested that his father receive a Catholic burial. As the Chief had been seriously considering converting to Catholicism but had never actually been baptized, Hole in the Day was buried by Fr. Pierz, without a Requiem Mass, in the unconsecrated section of the Roman Catholic cemetery at Old Crow Wing.

According to Ojibwe author and historian Anton Treuer, the oral history passed down among Hole in the Day's extended family is that the Chief's non-Catholic relatives objected to Ignatius' choice of burial. This is why they secretly dug up the Chief's body, and reburied him with traditional Ojibwe ritual at a secret location near the town of White Earth.

Last years and death

In 1871, Father Pierz reluctantly accepted the limitations of age and retired to the predominantly German parish of Rich Prairie, Morrison County. It was renamed Pierz in his honor. His health, however, continued to decline.

In a letter written on January 20, 1872, Father Pierz declared, "During the past year, my eyesight has failed me so that I am unable to read newspapers anymore. In the eighty-seventh year of my life my health is perceptively declining. Two years ago, I was still able to take care of twelve missions, Indian, German, English-speaking. This year my Right Rev. Bishop urged me to retire and live with him or at least take charge of some small German mission. Two attacks of apoplexy endangered my life; but my homeopathic medicines soon restored my health. At the present I hear a continued buzzing sound in my ears, reminding me strongly that the time has come to prepare for my last mission journey."

On September 6, 1873, Father Pierz sailed for Slovenia to live out his last years. After spending the winter at the Franciscan monastery in his native Kamnik, he moved to Ljubljana, where he lived for several years as a permanent guest in the Archdiocesan Chancery.  The Austro-Hungarian Crown awarded him a full pension.

According to Fr. John Seliskar, who knew Fr. Pierz in his last years, "The past for him was a blank; he had no realization of his surroundings. He would frequently hail a cab and request the driver to take him to Wabasha, or some Indian mission he attended in America. A few minutes' drive would satisfy him, for he no longer remembered the order he had given the coachman. He left his memory and his mind among the red men. The writer of these lines remembers the aged missionary, bowed down with the weight of years, with a faraway look in his eyes, walking the streets of Laibach, but his spirit apparently wandering in the American forests."

Father Pierz died on January 22, 1880. After a Tridentine Requiem Mass offered by the Bishop of Ljubljana, he was interred in Saint Christopher's Cemetery in the Bežigrad District of Ljubljana. St. Christopher's Cemetery and the two churches associated with it were destroyed in 1955 to create a fairground for the 7th Congress of the Communist Party of Yugoslavia.

As of 1989, the current location of Father Pierz's remains is unknown.

Legacy

Father Pierz continues to be fondly remembered in both his native land and in central Minnesota. He remains a popular figure in Minnesota folklore, with stories about him passed down among both the Ojibwa and European-American Catholics of the area. 
The city of Pierz, Minnesota, which was Fr. Pierz's last parish assignment before returning to the Austro-Hungarian Empire, is named in his honor.
A statue of Fr. Pierz, which celebrates his role as a missionary and peacemaker by showing an Ojibwe warrior and a German-American settler kneeling before him, was dedicated in front of St. Cloud Hospital in 1952. During the early 21st century, however, the statue was removed following protests by the St. Cloud chapter of the American Indian Movement. The statue was erected instead in nearby Pierz, Minnesota.
In Slovenia, a bronze monument to him was erected in Podbrezje, his last parish assignment before going to the US.
A large collection of his letters and poetry are preserved in the Archives of the Republic of Slovenia in Ljubljana.
The Slovene Ethnographic Museum in Ljubljana holds numerous rare American Indian artifacts collected and donated by Father Pierz.
The St. Francis Xavier Catholic school in Sartell, Minnesota is also named in his honor.
 In 2018 a group of 39 Slovenian pilgrims visited both St. Cloud and the Church of St. Stephen to pay tribute to Fr. Pierz, Bishop James Trobec, and the role that Slovenian-American missionaries and pioneers had played in the building of Central Minnesota.

Quotes
A missioner in America is like a plaything in the hand of God. Sufferings and joys alternate constantly. No conquest for the Kingdom can be achieved here without exertion and the sweat of one's brow. Our dear Lord permits us to be humiliated and prepared by much suffering before he employs us as instruments of His mercy in the conversion of the Pagans and allows us to enjoy the comforts of soul their spiritual rebirth causes."

Legends
I remember an incident of Father Pierz and a man named Dugal, the Government blacksmith at Crow Wing. This Dugal was quite pious but went on a spree once in a while – once a month. And Father Pierz would meet him in this condition and say to him in French, 'You are drunk again, my pig.' Once, on a trip to Leech Lake, Father Pierz got a hold of Dugal's supply of whiskey and only gave it out to him in small portions. Dugal begged for the bottle but Pierz said, 'No, no, you my pig.' Dugal when drunk feared Pierz. Once as he saw Pierz entering a store and knowing he was under a good supple of liquor, Dugal hid himself under a buffalo robe. But Pierz chatted and stayed so long that Dugal finally gave up and, casting off the robe, said, 'Father, I confess!'

References

Further reading

 Drnovšek, Marjan. Franc Pirc (1785–1880): Sadjar na Kranjskem in misijonar v Ameriki. Naklo, 2003.
 Furlan, William. In Charity Unfeigned: The Life of Father Francis X. Pierz. St. Cloud, Minnesota: Diocese of Saint Cloud, 1952.
 Voigt, Robert. Crow Wing and Father Pierz. St. Cloud, Minnesota: Diocese of Saint Cloud, 1989.

1785 births
1880 deaths
19th-century Carniolan writers
19th-century American Roman Catholic priests
American people of Slovenian descent
American poetry in immigrant languages
Austro-Hungarian emigrants to the United States
Carniolan Catholic poets
Carniolan Roman Catholic priests
Catholic Church in Minnesota
Catholics from Michigan
Catholics from Minnesota
Catholics from Wisconsin
Deaths from dementia in Austria-Hungary
Minnesota folklore
Native American Christianity
Native American history of Michigan
Native American history of Minnesota
Ojibwe
Ojibwe in Minnesota
People from the Municipality of Kamnik
People from Harbor Springs, Michigan
People from Ashland County, Wisconsin
People from Pierz, Minnesota
Poets from Minnesota
Poet priests
Roman Catholic Ecclesiastical Province of Saint Paul and Minneapolis
Roman Catholic missionaries in the United States
Roman Catholic missionaries in Canada
Slovenian Catholic poets
Slovenian poets
Slovenian male poets
Slovenian Roman Catholic missionaries
Writers from Minnesota